The Elizabeth City State Vikings are the athletic teams that represent Elizabeth City State University, located in Elizabeth City, North Carolina, in intercollegiate sports at the Division II level of the National Collegiate Athletic Association (NCAA), primarily competing in the Central Intercollegiate Athletic Association since the 1957–58 academic year.

Elizabeth City State competes in ten intercollegiate varsity sports. Men's sports include basketball, cross country, football, and golf; while women's sports include basketball, bowling, cross country, softball, tennis, and volleyball.

Conference affiliations 
NCAA
 Central Intercollegiate Athletic Association (1957–present)

Varsity teams 
The Vikings also sponsor a cheerleading team. The program sponsored a baseball team until the end of the 2013–14 season, when the sport was suspended in hopes of a 2017–18 return.

Notable alumni

Football 
 Tim Cofield
 Bobby Futrell
 Larry Johnson
 Reggie Langhorne
 Everett McIver
 Jethro Pugh
 John Walton

Men's basketball 
 Mike Gale
 Anthony Hilliard

References

External links